Lincoln Green is a mainly residential area of Leeds, West Yorkshire, England around Lincoln Green Road, and is adjacent to and southwest of St James's University Hospital. It falls within the Burmantofts and Richmond Hill ward of the City of Leeds Council.  The area was given this name in 1954, at the start of major redevelopment by the City Council.

The Lincoln Green estate on the north side of Lincoln Green Road is mainly tower blocks and low-rise flats, which replaced the terraced houses known as New Town in about 1958, following the 1950s slum clearances.  On the south side of Lincoln Green Road is the Lincoln Green Shopping Centre, opened by celebrity Pat Phoenix (Elsie Tanner from Coronation Street) and community buildings and low-rise housing.

There are two places of worship, the Lincoln Green Mosque, and the Christian Achiever's Faith chapel in a room above shops on Cherry Row. 
The one pub, the Harp, closed in June 2016: it was said to be the last genuine Irish pub in the city.  A Working men's club closed in 2013 and is now demolished with plans for a supermarket on the site.

Lincoln Green featured in the 2009 ITV programme Seven Days on the Breadline.

Location grid

References 

Places in Leeds